The Godinești is a right tributary of the river Berheci in Romania. It flows into the Berheci in Vultureni.

References

Rivers of Romania
Rivers of Bacău County